The Federation of Medical Students in Taiwan (FMSTW), as the representative of all the medical students in Taiwan, consists of 12 medical colleges, including 16 departments of medicine, post-baccalaureate medicine, Chinese medicine, post-baccalaureate Chinese medicine. and one observer member. FMSTW also works as a formal member in both International Federation of Medical Students' Associations (IFMSA) and Asian Medical Students' Association (AMSA), representing medical students from Taiwan in all forms of international organisations and campaigns.

Aims
 Promote interactions among medical students all over the country.
 Protect and fight for the rights belong to medical students in Taiwan.
 Integrate medical students in Taiwan to make good contributions to society.
 Participate in international affairs as a deputation of medical students in Taiwan.

See also
 List of medical schools in Taiwan

References

1988 establishments in Taiwan
Student organizations in Taiwan
Medicine in Taiwan
Student organizations established in 1988